A ghost mine is a pyrotechnic device which projects a large, ethereal-looking colored fireball into the sky. The effect is produced by mixing methyl alcohol with a pyrotechnic colorant. Since alcohol burns with a nearly invisible flame, all that is seen by the audience is a cloud of glowing color (the colorant) taking the shape of the invisible fireball. It was invented by Chris Spurrell, a research chemist from Hawthorne, California.

References 

Pyrotechnics